Mallasandra is a village in the southern state of Karnataka, India. It is located in the Gauribidanur taluk of Chikkaballapura district in Karnataka. It is situated 18 km away from sub-district headquarter Gauribidanur and 35 km away from district headquarter Chikkaballapura.

Demographics
According to Census 2011 information the location code or village code of Mallasandra village is 623354.  Mallasandra village belongs to G Bommsandra gram panchayat.

The total geographical area of village is 583.3 hectares. Mallasandra has a total population of 1,406 peoples with 706 males and 700 females. There are about 345 houses in Mallasandra village. Gauribidanur is nearest town to Mallasandra which is approximately 18 km away.

Economy
People belonging to the Mallasandra village grow very much maize, millet silk, etc. The major occupations of the residents of Mallasandra are sericulture and dairy farming. The dairy cooperative is the largest individual milk supplying cooperative in the state.

Facilities
Mallasandra has below types of facilities.
 Government higher primary School
 Mallasandra KMF (Karnataka Milk Federation) Dairy
 kitturu rani chennamma residencial school

Temples
 Basava Temple
 Kalika devi Temple
 Grama Devate Temple
 goerge ashram

References

External links
 https://chikkaballapur.nic.in/en/

Villages in Chikkaballapur district